Jason Medeiros (born August 22, 1989, in Hamilton, Ontario) is a Canadian football offensive lineman most recently for the Hamilton Tiger-Cats of the Canadian Football League. He was signed as an undrafted free agent on March 28, 2013.

After the 2011 CIS season, he was ranked as the tenth best player in the Canadian Football League's Amateur Scouting Bureau January rankings for players eligible in the 2012 CFL Draft, and seventh by players in Canadian Interuniversity Sport. He is a graduate of St. Thomas More Catholic Secondary School in Hamilton and played CIS football with the McMaster Marauders and was a part of their 2011 Vanier Cup championship.

Also in 2011, Medeiros was part of the Canada roster that got the silver medal in the World Championship.

Medeiros was named a CIS All-Canadian in 2012. After going undrafted, he participated of the Hamilton Tiger-Cats training camp before returning to McMaster. He helped the Marauders reach their second consecutive Vanier Cup finals, reprising the previous year match against Laval Rouge et Or. This time, they would lose.

In March 2013, Medeiros signed with the Hamilton Tiger-Cats as a free agent. He was released in June without a single appearance in a CFL official game.

References

1989 births
Living people
Players of Canadian football from Ontario
Canadian football offensive linemen
McMaster Marauders football players
Hamilton Tiger-Cats players
Sportspeople from Hamilton, Ontario
Canadian people of Portuguese descent